Daniel Klíma (born 30 December 2002) is a speedway rider from the Czech Republic.

Speedway career 
Klíma won the bronze medal at the 2020 European U19 Championship. The following year he made two appearances in the World Championship season during the 2021 Speedway Grand Prix.

He competed in the final of the 2021 Speedway Under-21 World Championship and finished 18th in the final standings of the 2022 SGP2.

In 2022, he was riding for Gorzów U24 in Poland.

References 

Living people
2002 births
Czech speedway riders